The  is a third-generation home video game console manufactured by Casio and released in Japan in 1983. It was discontinued less than a year after release.

History 
The PV-1000 was released in October 1983. It was only released in Japan where it sold for 14,800 yen. Casio failed to achieve a significant market share. According to retrogames.co.uk the console was pulled after several weeks due to low sales.

PV-2000 
The PV-2000 was released shortly after the PV1000. It is compatible with PV-1000 controllers but not its games, as it features a different architecture.

In the same year Casio released two other consoles, the PV-7 and the PV-16 which were MSX computers.

Technical details 
The PV-1000 is powered by a Zilog Z80 CPU, with 2 KB RAM, with 1 KB allocated as VRAM. It also has an additional 1 KB devoted to a character generator. The console contains a NEC D65010G031 chip used to output video and sound. It generating 256x192 pixels with 8 colours.It had three square wave voices with 6 bits to control the period.

Games 
Only thirteen games were released for the Casio PV-1000:

 #1 Pooyan
 #2 Super Cobra
 #3 Tutankham
 #4 Amidar
 #5 Dig Dug
 #6 Warp & Warp
 #7 Turpin
 #9 Pachinko UFO
 #10 Fighting Bug (also known as Lady Bug)
 #11 Space Panic
 #12 Naughty Boy
 #14 Dirty Chameleon
 #15 Excite Mahjong

Note: Cartridges #8 and #13 were never released. Often rumored to be Galaga and Front Line (which were released on the Casio PV-2000).

See also
Casio Loopy

References

Casio products
Home video game consoles
Third-generation video game consoles
1983 in video gaming
Computer-related introductions in 1983
Products introduced in 1983